Dixon is an unincorporated community in Greene County, Indiana, in the United States.

History
Dixon was named for its founder, Daniel Dixon. A post office was established at Dixon in 1873, and remained in operation until it was discontinued in 1904.

References

Unincorporated communities in Greene County, Indiana
Unincorporated communities in Indiana